The urban area of Medellín, Colombia is divided into six zones, which in turn are divided into 16 communes. Communes are then divided into neighborhoods and institutional areas. The city has 249 neighborhoods and 20 institutional areas. Institutional areas are large sectors with some neighborhood characteristics, but its populations are not permanent and lack housing. An example of an institutional area is a university campus.

The rural areas of Medellín are divided into 5 corregimientos, these in turn are divided into villages. The districts San Antonio de Prado and San Cristóbal are the most populous districts Colombia, with over thirty thousand inhabitants each. Medellín is structured following the flow of the Medellín River, which runs from south to north.

The six zones and 16 communes are the following:
 Zone 1 - Northeast
 Commune 1 - Popular
 Commune 2 - Santa Cruz
 Commune 3 - Manrique
 Commune 4 - Aranjuez
 Zone 2 - Northwest
 Commune 5 - Castilla
 Commune 6 - Doce de octubre
 Commune 7 - Robledo
 Zone 3 - Center east
 Commune 8 - Villa Hermosa
 Commune 9 - Buenos Aires
 Commune 10 - La Candelaria
 Zone 4 - Center west
 Commune 11 - Laureles—Estadio
 Commune 12 - La América
 Commune 13 - San Javier
 Zone 5 - Suroriental
 Commune 14 - El Poblado
 Zone 6 - Suroccidental
 Commune 15 - Guayabal
 Commune 16 - Belén

References